Dunham Township is located in McHenry County, Illinois, USA. As of the 2010 census, its population was 2,844 and it contained 1,035 housing units. It includes southern portions of Harvard, most of the city being in Chemung Township.

Dunham Township changed its name from Byron Township on December 28, 1850, to avoid confusion with Byron Township and to honor a resident, Solomon J. Dunham.

Geography

Demographics

References

External links
City-data.com
Illinois State Archives

Townships in McHenry County, Illinois
Townships in Illinois